The NZR DSB class locomotive is a type of shunting locomotive introduced to New Zealand's national rail network in 1954 by New Zealand Railways (NZR).

Introduction 
In 1950, NZR placed an order for 25 DSB shunting locomotives. They were built by the Drewry Car Co. between 1954 and 1956. The first three DSB class locomotives were commissioned in August 1954. The DSB are a larger and more powerful locomotive than the DS and DSA classes and were used all over New Zealand. A second batch of three locomotives built by Mitsubishi Heavy Industries was introduced in 1967.

The Drewry type B-2 had a cover-plate over the locomotive's jackshaft to prevent staff from being caught by the jackshaft while riding on the cab steps.

By the end of their lives, 12 DSBs were repainted in the "International Orange" livery.

Withdrawal 
In line with NZR's policy of rationalising locomotive classes, the DSB class was entirely withdrawn by the end of the 1980s.

As of July 2014 only one has been preserved, DSB313 was purchased in January 1991 by the Mainline Steam Heritage Trust for shunting at their Parnell depot.

References

Footnotes

Citations

Bibliography

 

DSB class
Railway locomotives introduced in 1954